Andrea Walther (born 1970) is a German applied mathematician whose research interests include nonlinear optimization, non-smooth optimization, and scientific computing, and who is known in particular for her work on automatic differentiation. She is professor of mathematical optimization in the institute for mathematics of Humboldt University of Berlin.

Education and career
After studying business mathematics at the University of Bayreuth beginning in 1991 and earning a diploma in 1996, Walther completed a doctorate at the Dresden University of Technology in 1999. She completed a habilitation at the Dresden University of Technology in 2008.

She worked as a research assistant and junior professor at the Dresden University of Technology from 2000 to 2008. In 2009, she took a professorship at Paderborn University, and in 2019 she moved to her present position at Humboldt University.

Since 2020 she has been convenor of European Women in Mathematics.

Book
With her advisor Andreas Griewank, Walther is the coauthor of the second edition of the book Evaluating derivatives: principles and techniques of algorithmic differentiation (Society for Industrial and Applied Mathematics, 2008).

References

External links
Home page

1970 births
Living people
21st-century German mathematicians
German women mathematicians
University of Bayreuth alumni
TU Dresden alumni
Academic staff of TU Dresden
Academic staff of Paderborn University
Academic staff of the Humboldt University of Berlin